Tebenna gemmalis is a moth of the family Choreutidae. It is found in North America from California to British Columbia.

The forewings are dark yellow or orange in the basal third, divided in two by dark longitudinal lines. The remainder of the wing is dark gray, covered with whitish spots that give a dappled appearance. There are three black patches aligned longitudinally in the distal half of wing, interspersed by two bands of cream-colored scales. The hindwings are brownish-gray with a dark terminal line and a long bicolored fringe.

Adults are on wing from April to July in California.

References

External links
mothphotographersgroup

gemmalis
Moths of North America
Fauna of the Sierra Nevada (United States)
Moths described in 1886